Quantitative Marketing and Economics is a quarterly peer-reviewed scientific journal publishing original research on the intersection of marketing and economics.

Overview
The journal was established in 2003 at Kluwer Academic Publishers and is currently published by Springer Science+Business Media, into which Kluwer Academic merged in 2004. The founding editor-in-chief was Peter E. Rossi (University of Chicago Booth School of Business), and the current one is Thomas Otter (Goethe University Frankfurt). According to the Journal Citation Reports, the journal has a 2017 impact factor of 1.000.

References

External links

Digital Marketing Blog

Marketing journals
Economics journals
Quantitative marketing research
Springer Science+Business Media academic journals
English-language journals
Publications established in 2003
Quarterly journals